Deborah Chiesa and Martina Colmegna were the defending champions, but they lost in the quarterfinals to Montserrat González and Ilona Kremen.

Julia Glushko and Priscilla Hon won the title, defeating González and Kremen in the final, 2–6, 7–6(7–4), [10–8].

Seeds

Draw

References
Main Draw

Internazionali Femminili di Brescia - Doubles